In the mathematical discipline of functional analysis, the concept of a compact operator on Hilbert space is an extension of the concept of a matrix acting on a finite-dimensional vector space; in Hilbert space, compact operators are precisely the closure of finite-rank operators (representable by finite-dimensional matrices) in the topology induced by the operator norm. As such, results from matrix theory can sometimes be extended to compact operators using similar arguments. By contrast, the study of general operators on infinite-dimensional spaces often requires a genuinely different approach.

For example, the spectral theory of compact operators on Banach spaces takes a form that is very similar to the Jordan canonical form of matrices. In the context of Hilbert spaces, a square matrix is unitarily diagonalizable if and only if it is normal. A corresponding result holds for normal compact operators on Hilbert spaces. More generally, the compactness assumption can be dropped. As stated above, the techniques used to prove results, e.g., the spectral theorem, in the non-compact case are typically different, involving operator-valued measures on the spectrum.

Some results for compact operators on Hilbert space will be discussed, starting with general properties before considering subclasses of compact operators.

Definition 
Then, an operator  is said to be a compact operator if the image of each bounded set under  is relatively compact.

Some general properties 
We list in this section some general properties of compact operators.

If X and Y are Hilbert spaces (in fact, X Banach and Y normed will suffice), then T : X → Y is compact if and only if it is continuous when viewed as a map from X with the weak topology to Y (with the norm topology). (See , and note in this reference that the uniform boundedness will apply in the situation where F ⊆ X satisfies (∀φ ∈ Hom(X, K)) sup{x**(φ) = φ(x) : x} < ∞, where K is the underlying field. The uniform boundedness principle applies since Hom(X, K) with the norm topology will be a Banach space, and the maps x** : Hom(X,K) → K are continuous homomorphisms with respect to this topology.)

The family of compact operators is a norm-closed, two-sided, *-ideal in L(H). Consequently, a compact operator T cannot have a bounded inverse if H is infinite-dimensional. If ST = TS = I, then the identity operator would be compact, a contradiction.

For example, consider the Hilbert space  with standard basis {en}. Let Pm be the orthogonal projection on the linear span of {e1, ..., em}. The sequence {Pm} converges to the identity operator I strongly but not uniformly. Define T by  T is compact, and, as claimed above, PmT → IT = T in the uniform operator topology: for all x,

Notice each Pm is a finite-rank operator. Similar reasoning shows that if T is compact, then T is the uniform limit of some sequence of finite-rank operators.

By the norm-closedness of the ideal of compact operators, the converse is also true.

The quotient C*-algebra of L(H) modulo the compact operators is called the Calkin algebra, in which one can consider properties of an operator up to compact perturbation.

Compact self-adjoint operator 
A bounded operator T on a Hilbert space H is said to be self-adjoint if T = T*, or equivalently,

It follows that ⟨Tx, x⟩ is real for every x ∈ H, thus eigenvalues of T, when they exist, are real. When a closed linear subspace L of H is invariant under T, then the restriction of T to L is a self-adjoint operator on L, and furthermore, the orthogonal complement L⊥ of L is also invariant under T. For example, the space H can be decomposed as the orthogonal direct sum of two T–invariant closed linear subspaces: the kernel of T, and the orthogonal complement  of the kernel (which is equal to the closure of the range of T, for any bounded self-adjoint operator). These basic facts play an important role in the proof of the spectral theorem below.

The classification result for Hermitian  matrices is the spectral theorem: If M = M*, then M is unitarily diagonalizable, and the diagonalization of M has real entries. Let T be a compact self-adjoint operator on a Hilbert space H. We will prove the same statement for T: the operator T can be diagonalized by an orthonormal set of eigenvectors, each of which corresponds to a real eigenvalue.

Spectral theorem 
Theorem For every compact self-adjoint operator T on a real or complex Hilbert space H, there exists an orthonormal basis of H consisting of eigenvectors of T. More specifically, the orthogonal complement of the kernel of T admits either a finite orthonormal basis of eigenvectors of T, or a countably infinite orthonormal basis {en} of eigenvectors of T, with corresponding eigenvalues , such that .

In other words, a compact self-adjoint operator can be unitarily diagonalized. This is the spectral theorem.

When H is separable, one can mix the basis {en} with a countable orthonormal basis for the kernel of T, and obtain an orthonormal basis {fn} for H, consisting of eigenvectors of T with real eigenvalues {μn} such that .

Corollary For every compact self-adjoint operator T on a real or complex separable infinite-dimensional Hilbert space H, there exists a countably infinite orthonormal basis {fn} of H consisting of eigenvectors of T, with corresponding eigenvalues , such that .

The idea 
Let us discuss first the finite-dimensional proof. It proves the spectral theorem for a Hermitian n × n matrix T hinges on showing the existence of one eigenvector x.

The existence of an eigenvector can be shown in (at least) two alternative ways:

One can argue algebraically: The characteristic polynomial of T has a complex root, therefore T has an eigenvalue with a corresponding eigenvector.

Note. In the finite-dimensional case, part of the first approach works in much greater generality; any square matrix, not necessarily Hermitian, has an eigenvector. This is simply not true for general operators on Hilbert spaces.  In infinite dimensions, it is also not immediate how to generalize the concept of the characteristic polynomial.

The spectral theorem for the compact self-adjoint case can be obtained analogously: one finds an eigenvector by extending the second finite-dimensional argument above, then apply induction. We first sketch the argument for matrices.

Since the closed unit sphere S in R2n is compact, and f is continuous, f(S) is compact on the real line, therefore f attains a maximum on S, at some unit vector y. By Lagrange's multiplier theorem, y satisfies

for some λ. By Hermiticity, .

Alternatively, let z ∈ Cn be any vector. Notice that if a unit vector y maximizes ⟨Tx, x⟩ on the unit sphere (or on the unit ball), it also maximizes the Rayleigh quotient:

Consider the function:

By calculus, i.e.,

Define:

After some algebra the above expression becomes ( denotes the real part of a complex number)

But z is arbitrary, therefore . This is the crux of proof for spectral theorem in the matricial case.

Note that while the Lagrange multipliers generalize to the infinite-dimensional case, the compactness of the unit sphere is lost. This is where the assumption that the operator T be compact is useful.

Details 
Claim  If T is a compact self-adjoint operator on a non-zero Hilbert space H and

then m(T) or −m(T) is an eigenvalue of T.

If , then T = 0 by the polarization identity, and this case is clear. Consider the function

If f attains its maximum m(T) on B at some unit vector y, then, by the same argument used for matrices, y is an eigenvector of T, with corresponding eigenvalue  = .

By the Banach–Alaoglu theorem and the reflexivity of H, the closed unit ball B is weakly compact. Also, the compactness of T means (see above) that T : X with the weak topology → X with the norm topology is continuous. By maximality,  which in turn implies that y also maximizes the Rayleigh quotient g(x) (see above). This shows that y is an eigenvector of T, and ends the proof of the claim.

Note. The compactness of T is crucial. In general, f need not be continuous for the weak topology on the unit ball B. For example, let T be the identity operator, which is not compact when H is infinite-dimensional. Take any orthonormal sequence {yn}. Then yn converges to 0 weakly, but lim f(yn) = 1 ≠ 0 = f(0).

Let T be a compact operator on a Hilbert space H. A finite (possibly empty) or countably infinite orthonormal sequence {en} of eigenvectors of T, with corresponding non-zero eigenvalues, is constructed by induction as follows. Let H0 = H and T0 = T. If m(T0) = 0, then T = 0 and the construction stops without producing any eigenvector en. Suppose that orthonormal eigenvectors  of T have been found. Then  is invariant under T, and by self-adjointness, the orthogonal complement Hn of En is an invariant subspace of T. Let Tn denote the restriction of T to Hn. If m(Tn) = 0, then Tn = 0, and the construction stops. Otherwise, by the claim applied to Tn, there is a norm one eigenvector en of T in Hn, with corresponding non-zero eigenvalue λn = .

Let F = (span{en})⊥, where {en} is the finite or infinite sequence constructed by the inductive process; by self-adjointness, F is invariant under T. Let S denote the restriction of T to F. If the process was stopped after finitely many steps, with the last vector em−1, then F= Hm and S = Tm = 0 by construction. In the infinite case, compactness of T and the weak-convergence of en to 0 imply that , therefore . Since F is contained in Hn for every n, it follows that m(S) ≤ m({Tn}) = |λn| for every n, hence m(S) = 0. This implies again that .

The fact that S = 0 means that F is contained in the kernel of T. Conversely, if x ∈ ker(T) then by self-adjointness, x is orthogonal to every eigenvector {en} with non-zero eigenvalue. It follows that , and that {en} is an orthonormal basis for the orthogonal complement of the kernel of T. One can complete the diagonalization of T by selecting an orthonormal basis of the kernel. This proves the spectral theorem.

A shorter but more abstract proof goes as follows: by Zorn's lemma, select U to be a maximal subset of H with the following three properties: all elements of U are eigenvectors of T, they have norm one, and any two distinct elements of U are orthogonal. Let F be the orthogonal complement of the linear span of U. If F ≠ {0}, it is a non-trivial invariant subspace of T, and by the initial claim, there must exist a norm one eigenvector y of T in F. But then U ∪ {y} contradicts the maximality of U. It follows that F = {0}, hence span(U) is dense in H. This shows that U is an orthonormal basis of H consisting of eigenvectors of T.

Functional calculus 
If T is compact on an infinite-dimensional Hilbert space H, then T is not invertible, hence σ(T), the spectrum of T, always contains 0. The spectral theorem shows that σ(T) consists of the eigenvalues {λn} of T and of 0 (if 0 is not already an eigenvalue). The set σ(T) is a compact subset of the complex numbers, and the eigenvalues are dense in σ(T).

Any spectral theorem can be reformulated in terms of a functional calculus. In the present context, we have:

Theorem. Let C(σ(T)) denote the C*-algebra of continuous functions on σ(T). There exists a unique isometric homomorphism  such that Φ(1) = I and, if f is the identity function , then . Moreover, .

for every n. Since Φ(f) is diagonal with respect to an orthonormal basis, its norm is equal to the supremum of the modulus of diagonal coefficients,

The other properties of Φ can be readily verified. Conversely, any homomorphism Ψ satisfying the requirements of the theorem must coincide with Φ when f is a polynomial. By the Weierstrass approximation theorem, polynomial functions are dense in C(σ(T)), and it follows that . This shows that Φ is unique.

The more general continuous functional calculus can be defined for any self-adjoint (or even normal, in the complex case) bounded linear operator on a Hilbert space. The compact case described here is a particularly simple instance of this functional calculus.

Simultaneous diagonalization 
Consider an Hilbert space H (e.g. the finite-dimensional Cn), and a commuting set  of self-adjoint operators. Then under suitable conditions, it can be simultaneously (unitarily) diagonalized. Viz., there exists an orthonormal basis Q consisting of common eigenvectors for the operators — i.e.,

Notice we did not have to directly use the machinery of matrices at all in this proof. There are other versions which do.

We can strengthen the above to the case where all the operators merely commute with their adjoint; in this case we remove the term "orthogonal" from the diagonalisation. There are weaker results for operators arising from representations due to Weyl–Peter. Consider the continuous shift action:

Then if G were compact then there is a unique decomposition of H into a countable direct sum of finite-dimensional, irreducible, invariant subspaces (this is essentially diagonalisation of the family of operators ). If G were not compact, but were abelian, then diagonalisation is not achieved, but we get a unique continuous decomposition of H into 1-dimensional invariant subspaces.

Compact normal operator 
The family of Hermitian matrices is a proper subset of matrices that are unitarily diagonalizable. A matrix M is unitarily diagonalizable if and only if it is normal, i.e., M*M = MM*. Similar statements hold for compact normal operators.

Let T be compact and T*T = TT*. Apply the Cartesian decomposition to T: define

The self-adjoint compact operators R and J are called the real and imaginary parts of T, respectively. T is compact means T*, consequently, R and J are compact. Furthermore, the normality of T implies R and J commute. Therefore they can be simultaneously diagonalized, from which follows the claim.

A hyponormal compact operator (in particular, a subnormal operator) is normal.

Unitary operator 
The spectrum of a unitary operator U lies on the unit circle in the complex plane; it could be the entire unit circle. However, if U is identity plus a compact perturbation, U has only a countable spectrum, containing 1 and possibly, a finite set or a sequence tending to 1 on the unit circle. More precisely, suppose  where C is compact. The equations  and  show that C is normal. The spectrum of C contains 0, and possibly, a finite set or a sequence tending to 0. Since , the spectrum of U is obtained by shifting the spectrum of C by 1.

Examples 
 Let H = L2([0, 1]).
 Let K(x, y) be square-integrable on [0, 1]2 and define TK on H by  Then TK is compact on H; it is a Hilbert–Schmidt operator.
 Suppose that the kernel K(x, y) satisfies the Hermiticity condition:  Then TK is compact and self-adjoint on H; if {φn} is an orthonormal basis of eigenvectors, with eigenvalues {λn}, it can be proved that  where the sum of the series of functions is understood as L2 convergence for the Lebesgue measure . Mercer's theorem gives conditions under which the series converges to K(x, y) pointwise, and uniformly .

See also

 
 
  − If the compactness assumption is removed, operators need not have countable spectrum in general.
 
  − The notion of singular values can be extended from matrices to compact operators.

References

J. Blank, P. Exner, and M. Havlicek, Hilbert Space Operators in Quantum Physics, American Institute of Physics, 1994. 
M. Reed and B. Simon, Methods of Modern Mathematical Physics I: Functional Analysis, Academic Press, 1972.

Hilbert space
Articles containing proofs
Operator theory
Linear operators